McKeel Academy of Technology is a junior and senior high school of over 1,000 students located in Lakeland, Florida, United States. It is located approximately a half mile southeast of Kathleen High School and cannot be viewed from any major road. In addition to being technology oriented, the school stresses career choices for each student.  The school originally was Seth McKeel Jr High, and became McKeel Academy in the 1990s. McKeel Academy is a school of choice and students from anywhere within Polk County can attend.  Entering students are selected through an open enrollment lottery.  Students graduating from one of the McKeel Elementary Schools, siblings of current students, students that were previously in South Mckeel Academy, and children of staff members are given priority.

Growth

In 2003, McKeel sponsored the charter and creation of McKeel Elementary Academy or MEA housing approximately 340 K-5 students.  South McKeel Elementary Academy (approximately 560 K-5 students) opened in 2006.  Both elementary schools have been rated as A schools under Florida's school accountability rating system for every year of their operation.

Athletics 
McKeel Academy offers students 20 during fall, winter and spring. Some of the sports offerings include soccer, baseball, golf, cross country and weight lifting.  McKeel Academy has won multiple district and regional titles over the years and in 2008 was state runner up in softball.

References

External links

1987 establishments in Florida
Educational institutions established in 1987
Schools in Lakeland, Florida
High schools in Polk County, Florida
Public high schools in Florida
Public middle schools in Florida
Charter schools in Florida